Mehmet Yozgatlı (born January 9, 1979) is a Turkish former footballer who played as a winger and currently an assistant manager of Fenerbahçe.

Career

Club
Mehmet signed a -year contract with Fenerbahçe on January 30, 2004. His debut for Fenerbahçe came on February 1, 2004.  He was on the Galatasaray S.K. squad that won the 2000 UEFA Cup.  On 18 June 2007 he signed 2+1 years contract with Beşiktaş J.K. This contract was cancelled by Beşiktaş after one season.  On 7 January 2011, he has agreed to a one-year contract with Çaykur Rizespor.

Coaching
On 27 February 2019, he is appointed as manager of Utaş Uşakspor, competing at TFF Second League. He left the position at the end of the season and was appointed assistant manager of Alanyaspor.

Honours
Galatasaray
Turkish Super League: 1999–00
UEFA Cup: 2000
Fenerbahçe
Turkish Super League: 2004-05, 2006-07

References

External links
Profile at TFF

Guardian Stats Centre

1979 births
Living people
People from Melle, Germany
Turkish footballers
Turkey B international footballers
Turkey under-21 international footballers
Turkey youth international footballers
German footballers
German people of Turkish descent
Adanaspor footballers
Fenerbahçe S.K. footballers
Galatasaray S.K. footballers
İstanbulspor footballers
Beşiktaş J.K. footballers
Gaziantepspor footballers
Çaykur Rizespor footballers
Süper Lig players
UEFA Cup winning players
Association football midfielders
Footballers from Lower Saxony